The Venerable  Kenneth Kay  (1902 – 1958) was Archdeacon of Bradford, England, from 1953 to 1957.

Kay was educated at the  Chorister School, Durham and the city's university and ordained in 1926. After a curacy at Herrington he became Chaplain of St Oswald, Lahore. Following this he was a Naval Chaplain serving on HMS Curacoa from 1931 to 1933 when he became Vicar of Queensbury (during World War II he returned to military service with the RNVR). In 1945 he became Vicar of Heaton and in 1948 an Honorary Canon of Bradford Cathedral.

References

1902 births
People educated at the Chorister School, Durham
Alumni of St Chad's College, Durham
Royal Naval Volunteer Reserve personnel of World War II
Archdeacons of Bradford
1958 deaths
Royal Navy chaplains
World War II chaplains